Days of Glory may refer to:

Days of Glory (1944 film), a World War II film starring Tamara Toumanova and Gregory Peck
Giorni di gloria (Days of Glory), a 1945 Italian documentary about the World War II Ardeatine massacre, directed by Giuseppe De Santis, Mario Serandrei, Marcello Pagliero and Luchino Visconti
Days of Glory (2006 film) (Indigènes), directed by Rachid Bouchareb

See also
 Glory Days (disambiguation)